Bothitrematidae is a family of flatworms belonging to the order Gyrodactylidea.

Genera:
 Bothitrema Price, 1936

References

Platyhelminthes